Edilio Jean Cardoso de Oliveira (born May 16, 1983), known as Edilio Cardoso, is a Brazilian footballer who plays as a forward for Estudiantes de Buenos Aires of the Primera B Metropolitana in Argentina.

Honors
Boca Juniors
 Argentine Primera División - Apertura: 2003–04
 Intercontinental Cup: 2003
 Copa Libertadores: 2003

References
 
 

1983 births
Living people
People from Alegrete
Sportspeople from Rio Grande do Sul
Brazilian footballers
Association football forwards
Boyacá Chicó F.C. footballers
Real Cartagena footballers
Boca Juniors footballers
San Lorenzo de Almagro footballers
Club Almirante Brown footballers
Defensores de Belgrano footballers
Estudiantes de Buenos Aires footballers
Argentine Primera División players
Categoría Primera A players
Brazilian expatriate footballers
Brazilian expatriate sportspeople in Argentina
Expatriate footballers in Argentina
Brazilian expatriate sportspeople in Colombia
Expatriate footballers in Colombia